Up Close and Personal is the ninth studio album (tenth included the co-credit on Future Road) by Australian recording artist Judith Durham. The album was released in Australia in May 2009.

Background and release
In July 2006, Durham was asked to sing a short set of spiritual songs a cappella for a gathering in Sydney. Durham said; "I had certainly never thought of singing 'a cappella' in a large auditorium before.  The purity of the simple presentation seemed to engender a very peaceful environment and for me the lyrics became more like prayers."
Following this experience, Durham spent two years recording an a cappella album, focussing on a repertoire of spiritually focussed material.

The album was launched with a one-off concert at the Melbourne Recital Centre on 23 May 2009.

The album was re-released in November 2016 under the title An A Cappella Experience with a bonus DVD of the recital which had been recorded.

Track listing
 "I'll Never Find Another You" (Tom Springfield) - 1:56
 "Just Do Your Best (And Leave The Rest To Him)" (Judith Durham) - 2:39
 "His Eye Is on the Sparrow" (Charles H. Gabriel, Civilla Martin) - 3:23
 "Calling Me Home" (Jeff Vincent,  Durham) - 3:29
 "Breathe On Me, Breath of God" (Edwin Hatch, Robert Jackson) - 4:27
 "Nobody But You" (Springfield) - 1:39
 "Precious Lord, Take My Hand" (George Allen, Rev. Thomas A. Dorsey) - 3:01
 "In the Garden" (C. Austin Miles) - 3:08
 "Make Me an Instrument of Your Peace" (Springfield) - 1:58
 "Colours Of My Life" (David Reilly, Durham) - 2:06
 "Oh Lord, Take Me Home" (Durham) - 4:36
 "Land Of Peace" (Bruce Woodley, Durham) - 2:52
 "Let Me Find Love" (Durham) - 3:07
 "Your Time is Now" (Ken Pearlman) - 2:01
 "I Cannot Cross This Wide Ocean" (Scott Dufault) - 2:12
 "Speak to the Sky" (Rick Springfield) - 2:09
 "Any Road You Choose" (Jeff Vincent, Durham) - 2:46
 "Kumbaya" (Marvin V. Frey) - 2:29
 "Walk With Me" (Springfield) - 2:29
 "Walking Side By Side" (Judy Wall, Pearlman) - 1:56
 "Anchor of My Life" (John Durrell, Durham) - 1:56
 "There He Is" (Peter Pye) - 2:02
 "Abide with Me" (Henry Francis Lyte) - 2:28
 "The Lord's Prayer" (Albert Hay Malotte) - 1:31

Weekly charts

Release history

References

Judith Durham albums
2009 albums